A partial solar eclipse occurred on June 17, 1928. A solar eclipse occurs when the Moon passes between Earth and the Sun, thereby totally or partly obscuring the image of the Sun for a viewer on Earth. A partial solar eclipse occurs in the polar regions of the Earth when the center of the Moon's shadow misses the Earth. This is the 1st solar eclipse of Solar Saros 155, and this is the new saros to begin since the partial solar eclipse of July 19, 1917.

Related eclipses

Solar eclipses 1924–1928

References

External links 

1928 6 17
1928 6 17
1928 in science
June 1928 events